Syr or SYR may refer to:

 Sigurd Syr (c. 970-1018), Norwegian petty king
 Sonic Youth Recordings
 South Yorkshire Railway (1849–1864)
 Sýr, a name of Freyja in Norse mythology
 The IATA airport code for Syracuse Hancock International Airport
 Syr Darya, a major river of Central Asia
 Syre, a river in Luxembourg
 Syria, ISO 3166-1 abbreviation
 ICAO designator for Syrian Air, a Syrian airline
 William F. Walsh Regional Transportation Center, Syracuse, New York

See also

 Sir (disambiguation)
 WSYR (disambiguation)